Hour of Power is a weekly American Evangelist television program broadcast from Shepherd's Grove Presbyterian Church in Irvine, California, near Los Angeles. It is one of the most watched religious broadcasts in the world, seen by approximately two million viewers. It was formerly broadcast from the Crystal Cathedral in Garden Grove, California.

The program was founded and first hosted by Robert H. Schuller. It is currently hosted by Bobby Schuller, who is Robert H. Schuller's grandson.

The program is normally one hour long, but some networks broadcast an edited 30-minute program.

History
The program first aired on February 8, 1970, as a church service of the Garden Grove Community Church (Reformed Church in America). By the 1980s, it was the most-watched weekly religious program in living rooms across America. It was originally hosted by the elder Schuller; the younger Schuller hosted it from 2006 to 2008. 

On July 9, 2008, the presidency of the church was shifted from Robert H. Schuller to his son-in-law, Jim Coleman. On October 26, 2008, it was announced that Schuller had removed his son, Robert A. Schuller, as teaching pastor, but allowed him to remain as the Crystal Cathedral's senior pastor. Robert H. Schuller said that he wanted to take the ministry in a different direction and for the foreseeable future would use guest speakers for the weekly services rather than his son. Well-known speakers who were used in the early stages of the new format included Lee Strobel, John C. Maxwell, and Bill Hybels. On November 29, 2008, the church announced that the younger Schuller had resigned.

On October 18, 2010, the board of the Crystal Cathedral filed for bankruptcy in Santa Ana, California.

On March 10, 2012, it was announced that Robert H. Schuller and his wife, Arvella, would be leaving the church. The following day their elder daughter, Sheila Schuller Coleman, announced at the morning service that she would also be leaving the church, therefore cutting all family ties with the Crystal Cathedral and Hour of Power, stating that "This is the last Sunday we will be worshiping in this building." The ministry's successor, the Rev. Bill Bennett, said that the ministry would continue but  using a more traditional service. In June 2012, the Rev. Bobby Schuller, the son of Robert A. Schuller, started preaching on a voluntary basis. In February 2013, Bobby Schuller was named as pastor for the Hour of Power. The Crystal Cathedral congregation was renamed Shepherd's Grove in 2013. Financial considerations dictated a move to a smaller property soon after, as well as a decision to sell the Crystal Cathedral, to the Roman Catholic Diocese of Orange for 49 million dollars. The diocese plans to spend over 100 million dollars on structural repairs and alterations necessary to adapt the building for Catholic services. When completed, it is to be rededicated as "Christ Cathedral". Following the move from the Garden Grove campus, services were held in the former Catholic church in the fall of 2013. The congregation moved to Irvine Presbyterian Church in April 2018 after it was sold to real estate developers.

Broadcasts
The program airs in the United States mainly using paid programming time on Freeform (TV channel), the Trinity Broadcasting Network/The Church Channel, Hillsong Channel, and recently Daystar (TV network). along with about 100 stations through individual contracts. The program also airs over the American Forces Network.

In Canada it is carried on VisionTV.

In Europe it is broadcast on VOX in Austria, Germany and Switzerland, on RTL in the Netherlands and was formerly broadcast on Sky One in Ireland and the United Kingdom.

In the Middle East it is carried on METV in Israel, Jordan, Lebanon, and Syria.

In Australia, it is seen on the Australian Christian Channel and Network Ten. It is also broadcast weekly on radio.

It is broadcast in New Zealand on the Prime network and Shine TV.

It is broadcast in Hong Kong on NOW TV Channel 564, TVB Pearl, and Hong Kong Open TV.

The Hour of Power telecast, filmed in the Crystal Cathedral's main sanctuary, at one point attracted 1.3 million viewers from 156 countries. Under current Pastor Bobby Schuller, the program attracted 2.2 million viewers worldwide each week.

Finances
Beginning in the late 1990s, the ministry struggled financially after it borrowed money to build a visitors' center.

The 2008 revenues for the program were nearly $5 million lower than revenues for 2007. As of early 2009, the church planned to sell more than $65 million worth of its Orange County property to pay off debt:  in San Juan Capistrano, California, and an office building in Garden Grove, California. Due to their financial situation, the Roman Catholic Diocese of Orange purchased the Garden Grove campus.

References

Further reading

External links

 YouTube channel

Christian television
1970 American television series debuts
1970s American television series
1980s American television series
1990s American television series
2000s American television series
2010s American television series
2020s American television series
Christian media
Evangelicalism in the United States
English-language television shows